Delhi Sher RFC is an Indian rugby club based in New Delhi, India. They currently participate in the All India & South Asia Rugby Tournament.

History
The club was founded under the name New Delhi RFC in 1996 when some players got together in a public park in the city. Later on the name was changed to Delhi Lions RFC before reverting to their current name. In 2012 the club undertook a tour of neighbouring Pakistan, taking part in a sevens tournament in Lahore and two fifteens matches.

References

External links
Delhi Lions RFC (Delhi Sher RFC)

Indian rugby union teams
Rugby clubs established in 1996